Volume Eight or Volume VIII or Volume 8 may refer to:

Volume 8 (Fabrizio De André album)
Volume 8: The Threat Is Real, by Anthrax
Volume Eight, an album published by Volume magazine
Volumes 7 & 8

See also